Mauro Abel Formica (born 4 April 1988) is an Argentine professional footballer who plays as an attacking midfielder for Colón. He is nicknamed El Gato (The Cat).

Career

Newell's Old Boys
Having signed a professional contract, Formica made his professional debut for Newell's Old Boys on 29 September 2006 at the age of 18, in a match against Club Atlético Colón, as the teams drew 1–1. After two-years since professional at Newell's Old Boys, Formica soon established himself in the first team in 2008–09 and in Torneo Apertura on 13 December 2008, Formica scored his first goal in a 3–0 win over Racing Club. Soon after, on the opening game of the season, Formica scored his first goal (and scored another) and set up a goal for Leandro Armani in a 3–0 win over Gimnasia. Soon in mid-May, Formica scored three goals in three consecutive games, against River Plate, Arsenal de Sarandí and Rosario Central. After the end of the season, Formica made sixteen appearances (having missed four appearances due to slight injury) and scoring seven.

The following season, Formica continued to retain his first team and in Torneo Inicial, Formica scored four goals in nineteen appearances. Shortly after the end of Torneo Inicial, Formica played his first game of Copa Libertadores in a 0–0 draw against Emelec in the first leg but the club was eliminated in the second leg, with a 2–1 score for Emelec. On the final game of the season of Torneo Final, Formica scored twice and set up a goal for Lucas Bernardi in a 6–1 win over Gimnasia, the team which he scored his first goal.

His good performance attracted attention from Europe with the likes of Ajax, AS Monaco, Galatasaray and Arsenal. Russian side Rubin Kazan made a bid for Formica but the offer was rejected. Soon after rival River Plate tried to sign him but the offer was also rejected.

Though rebuffing offers from Europe, Formica playing time was reduced under new manager Roberto Sensini. Though fallen out, Formica continued his form in Copa Sudamericana, scoring three goals, against Estudiantes and a brace against Club San Jose.

After leaving Newell's Old Boys, Formica played a total of 84 games scoring 22 goals for the club over 5 years. While at Newell's Old Boys, Formica is known for his technique, dribbling and speed. He is also known for his great shot from half-distance.

Blackburn Rovers
On the last day of the transfer window, Formica signed for Blackburn Rovers – on a four-year deal – reported to be worth around £4 million. Then-manager Steve Kean described Formica as a young Gabriel Batistuta, believing he's best prospects in Argentine football. However, Formica did not break into the squad, appearing instead for Blackburn reserves, often due to a lack of match fitness.

Kean tipped Formica as a future star going into his second season with Rovers, and on 13 August 2011, Formica scored on his Premier League debut for Rovers against Wolverhampton Wanderers in a 2–1 defeat at Ewood Park. On 20 August 2011, he came on for Jason Roberts on 75 minutes in a 3–1 defeat against Aston Villa at Villa Park. Four days later, Formica started and played the full 90 minutes in a 3–1 victory over Sheffield Wednesday at Ewood Park in the second round of the League Cup. On 27 August 2011, Formica won two penalties in a home league game against Everton. He missed one and so did Junior Hoilett, the match ended with Everton winning 1–0. In the January transfer window, Formica was expected to leave Blackburn, having been named one of Blackburn's player to leave the club, reportedly for personal reasons. Several days later, Formica revealed the club rejected a move back to his former club, with Blackburn want to sell for €5million. In mid-January, Formica was also linked with a move to Greek side Olympiacos, where he would join his brother, playing for a different Greek club. His brother told Sport24 that Mauro want to leave Blackburn, insisting the talk is ongoing However, the move to Greece fell through, as the club were unable to meet Blackburn's asking price. Later in the season, Formica would score three more goals against Tottenham Hotspur, Fulham and Norwich City. However, at the end of the season, Blackburn were relegated to the Championship.

Formica was in and out of the first team, due to change of management. On 17 November 2012, Formica scored his first goal of the season in a 4–1 win over Peterborough United and several weeks on, Formica made his last appearance in a 4–1 loss against Cardiff City. Formica hadn't played since throughout December and January, due to injury on the knee.

Palermo
On 23 January 2013, Serie A strugglers Palermo announced on their website to have signed Formica on loan until the end of the season, with an option to make the move permanent during the period of the loan spell. He made his debut four days later, as a second-half substitute for Josip Iličić in a 1–1 draw at Cagliari. In the next match in a 2–1 loss against Atalanta, Formica provided assist for Nélson Marcos from a cross, with Nélson scoring from a backheel.

Cruz Azul
On 13 August 2013, Cruz Azul announced on their website that they had signed Mauro Formica.

International career
Formica played his first cap, coming on for Ariel Cabral, in a 2–1 loss against Poland on 5 June 2011.

Personal life
Mauro is the younger brother of fellow professional player Lautaro Formica.

Career statistics

 (*) Copa Libertadores, Copa Sudamericana.

Honours
Cruz Azul
CONCACAF Champions League: 2013–14

References

External links
 
 
 
 

1988 births
Living people
Argentine footballers
Argentine expatriate footballers
Footballers from Rosario, Santa Fe
Argentine people of Italian descent
Association football midfielders
Argentina youth international footballers
Argentina international footballers
Newell's Old Boys footballers
Blackburn Rovers F.C. players
Palermo F.C. players
Cruz Azul footballers
Club Universidad Nacional footballers
Club Atlético Colón footballers
Argentine Primera División players
Premier League players
English Football League players
Serie A players
Liga MX players
Argentine expatriate sportspeople in England
Argentine expatriate sportspeople in Italy
Argentine expatriate sportspeople in Mexico
Expatriate footballers in England
Expatriate footballers in Italy
Expatriate footballers in Mexico